"Hello Heartache, Goodbye Love" is a popular song written by Hugo & Luigi and George David Weiss. The song was a 1963 international hit for Little Peggy March, hitting the top of the charts in Hong Kong, peaking at No. 26 on the Billboard Hot 100 in the United States, and reaching No. 29 on the UK Singles Chart.
March herself recorded an Italian version, too, with the title "Te ne vai " ("You're going").

Charts

References

1963 songs
1963 singles
Peggy March songs
Songs written by George David Weiss
Songs written by Hugo Peretti
Songs written by Luigi Creatore
Song recordings produced by Hugo & Luigi